Trust Fund Babies is a collaborative mixtape by American rappers Lil Wayne and Rich the Kid. It was released on October 1, 2021, by Young Money Entertainment, Republic Records, and Rostrum Records. It contains a sole guest appearance by American rapper YG. The mixtape's lead single, "Feelin' Like Tunechi", was released alongside the mixtape.

Critical reception

Trust Fund Babies received mixed reviews from music critics. Anthony Malone of HipHopDX criticized the lack of chemistry between the two rappers, writing: "Instead of trading bars and witty wordplay to keep the momentum going, verses are thrown together in a sequence that feels boring and uninspired." He concluded, "Trust Fund Babies doesnt succeed much at all, but it does create anticipation for Wayne's next solo work and further shows that even in his late 30s, Wayne can still rap circles around Great Value rappers." Alphonse Pierre of Pitchfork criticized Rich the Kid's performance, although he felt that the project contained some Lil Wayne's best rapping in years, writing: "The only reason to care about this mixtape is Wayne, even if it often sounds like he's being held captive in a studio by Rich and has to rap his way out [...] After years of health scares, label issues, and the depressingly awful raps between I Am Not a Human Being II and Free Weezy Album, it's just nice to hear Wayne rap adequately again."

Commercial performance
"Trust Fund Babies" debuted at number 35 on the US Billboard 200 chart, moving approximately 15,000 units first week.

Track listing

Charts

References

Lil Wayne albums
Rich the Kid albums
2021 mixtape albums
Young Money Entertainment albums